National Pingtung University of Science and Technology (NPUST) is a leading public university in Neipu Township, Pingtung County, Taiwan. It was established in April 1924 as the Kaohsiung District Pingtung Extension School of Agriculture and over the years it has undergone several restructurings and name changes. The current name of National Pingtung University of Science and Technology was adopted in August 1997. NPUST is the  university in Taiwan to host a Rescue Center for Endangered Wild Animals (PTRC), Shelter for Stray Dogs and Working Dog Training School. In addition to the Neipu Campus, it has land in Kenting National Park and Taitung County.

Academics 
NPUST has 26 departments, 35 master's programs, 8 doctoral programs, 1 international bachelor's degree program, and 2 international master's degree programs distributed among the colleges of Agriculture, Engineering, Management, Humanities and Social Sciences and Veterinary Medicine, and the International College. During the 2016 academic year, NPUST had 11,350 students, including 1,956 graduate students and 9,394 undergraduates.

National Pingtung University of Science and Technology offers one of the world's only graduate programs focussing on aquarium fish.

Location 
NPUST is in the Dawu Mountain foothills of northwestern Neipu Township in Pingtung County, near the Donggang River. The campus covers 298.3 hectares. NPUST is approximately 20 kilometers (12.5 miles) from the Pingtung Train Station and the trip takes around 30 minutes by car; the campus is also served by regular buses.

In addition to the Neipu Campus, NPUST has 285 hectares in the Baoli Forest of Kenting National Park and the 576-hectare Daren Ranch in Taitung County.

In 2020 National Pingtung University of Science and Technology was the most sustainable university in Taiwan according to the UI GreenMetric World University Rankings, the 4th most sustainable in Asia, and the 31st most sustainable in the world.

Research 
NPUST is cooperating with the United Nations Food and Agriculture Organization to establish an International Education College.

The International Institute for Infrastructural, Agriculture and Environmental Engineering (IAE) provides industry services and helps to strengthen academic industrial production. Currently it has established 14 centers for research and development.

They are one of the best schools in the world for tropical agriculture research. NPUST is part of the University Network of Tropical Agriculture. The technology transfer of offseason flowering forcing in longans has netted the University billions of NTD.

President 
Chang-Hsien Tai became president of NPUST in August 2014.

Notable alumni

 Fu-Sung Chiang, dean of College of Humanities and Social Sciences, National Taiwan Ocean University
 Lung-Mu Chen, chairman, Known-You Seed Co. Ltd.
 Shi-Jye Jin, Actor
 Su Chung, general director, National Taiwan Symphony Orchestra

See also
 List of universities in Taiwan

References

External links

Official website 

1924 establishments in Taiwan
Educational institutions established in 1924
Universities and colleges in Pingtung County
Scientific organizations based in Taiwan
Universities and colleges in Taiwan
Technical universities and colleges in Taiwan